A Pocketful of Chestnuts ) is a 1970 Italian comedy film directed by Pietro Germi.

Plot
Luigi Vivarelli is a television director, a cynical and unrepentant womanizer. One day he meets Carla Lotito, an architecture student, and is immediately attracted to her. But Carla isn't like the other women that Luigi deals with - she's a Catholic who believes in the old and simple values that modern society deems unfashionable. Both try to convince the other of the rightness of their philosophy, and their basic disagreements put their love in jeopardy.

Cast 
 Gianni Morandi: Luigi Vivarelli
 Stefania Casini: Carla Lotito
 Nicoletta Machiavelli: Teresa Lotito
 Patricia Allison: Lisa Lotito
 Franco Fabrizi: Bernardo Bembarbì
 Milla Sannoner: Maria Luisa
 Gigi Reder: Television Host
 Memè Perlini: Actor-Priest
 Stephan Zacharias: Don Raffaele
 Giuseppe Rinaldi: Poker Player Doctor

Reception
In his previous films, Pietro Germi sharply satirized the hypocritical morality and conformity of proper Italian society. In this film, however, he turned his scorn towards the "immoral" youth of the 1960s, defending the conservative values. For this reason the film was heavily attacked by Italian critics, criticizing it as didactic and reactionary. Germi angrily responded that "critics are only good for a sociological study - their reaction is proof of the cultural degeneration that they are a part of".

See also    
 List of Italian films of 1970

References

External links

1970 films
1970 comedy films
Commedia all'italiana
Films directed by Pietro Germi
Films scored by Carlo Rustichelli
1970s Italian films